Rocky Creek is a rural locality in the Toowoomba Region, Queensland, Australia. In the  Rocky Creek had a population of 41 people.

History 
Rocky Creek Provisional School opened on 9 February 1903. On 1 January 1909 it became Rocky Creek State School. It closed on 28 April 1972.

In the  Rocky Creek had a population of 41 people.

References 

Toowoomba Region
Localities in Queensland